The Sri Aurobindo Ashram is a spiritual community (ashram) located in Pondicherry, in the Indian territory of Puducherry. The ashram grew out of a small community of disciples who had gathered around Sri Aurobindo after he retired from politics and settled in Pondicherry in 1910. On 24 November 1926, after a major spiritual realization, Sri Aurobindo withdrew from public view in order to continue his spiritual work. At this time he handed over the full responsibility for the inner and outer lives of the sadhaks (spiritual aspirants) and the ashram to his spiritual collaborator, "The Mother", earlier known as Mirra Alfassa. This date is therefore generally known as the founding-day of the ashram, though, as Sri Aurobindo himself wrote, it had "less been created than grown around him as its centre."

History 

Life in the community that preceded the ashram was informal. Sri Aurobindo spent most of his time in writing and meditation. The three or four young men who had followed him to Pondicherry in 1910 lived with him and looked after the household. Otherwise, they were free to do as they wished. The Mother and French writer Paul Richard met Sri Aurobindo in 1914 and proposed that they bring out a monthly review; but after the outbreak of World War I, they were obliged to leave India, and Sri Aurobindo had to do almost all of the work on the review himself, helped a little by the young men who were living with him. In April 1920 the Mother returned to Pondicherry, and soon the community began to take the form of an ashram, more because the sadhaks "desired to entrust their whole inner and outer life to the Mother than from any intention or plan of hers or of Sri Aurobindo." After the ashram was given formal shape in 1926, it experienced a period of rapid growth, increasing from around 24 in the beginning of 1927 to more than 150 in 1934. The membership leveled off in 1934 owing to a lack of suitable housing.

During these years there was a regular routine. At 6:00 every morning, the Mother appeared on the ashram balcony to initiate the day with her blessings. Sadhaks would have woken very early and completed a good portion of the day's work including meditation and then assembled under the balcony to receive her blessings.

As the ashram grew, many departments came up and were looked after by the sadhaks as part of their sadhana: the offices, library, dining room, book/photograph printing, workshops, sports/playground, art gallery, dispensary/nursing home, farms, dairies, flower gardens, guest houses, laundry, bakery, etc. The heads of the departments met the Mother in the morning and took her blessings and orders. She would meet the sadhaks individually again at 10 am and, in the evening at 5:30 pm, she would conduct meditation and meet the sadhaks.

In addition, four times a year Sri Aurobindo and the Mother used to give public Darshans (spiritual gatherings where the guru bestows blessings) to thousands of devotees gathered to receive grace.

Present 

Once confined to a few buildings in one corner of Pondicherry, the ashram's growth has caused it to expand physically in all directions. Today, Ashramites live and work in more than 400 buildings spread throughout the town. The central focus of the community is one group of houses, including those in which Sri Aurobindo and the Mother dwelt for most of their lives in Pondicherry. This interconnected block of houses—called "the Ashram main-building", or more usually just "the Ashram"—surrounds a tree-shaded courtyard, at the centre of which lies the flower-covered "Samadhi". This white marble shrine holds, in two separate chambers, the physical remains of Sri Aurobindo and the Mother.

Today, Pondicherry has become an important destination for spiritual seekers as well as tourists. Thousands of visitors from all over the world come to the ashram.

The visiting hours for the visitors are from 8 am to 12 noon and then again from 2 pm to 6 pm.

Aims and ideals 
The Ashram, according to Sri Aurobindo, "has been created with another object than that ordinarily common to such institutions, not for the renunciation of the world but as a centre and a field of practice for the evolution of another kind and form of life which would in the final end be moved by a higher spiritual consciousness and embody a greater life of the spirit."

The practice of Integral Yoga, Sri Aurobindo explained, "does not proceed through any set mental teaching or prescribed forms of meditation, mantras or others, but by aspiration, by a self-concentration inwards or upwards, by self-opening to an Influence, to the Divine Power above us and its workings, to the Divine Presence in the heart, and by the rejection of all that is foreign to these things."

The complete method of Integral Yoga aims to transform human life into a divine life. In Sri Aurobindo's yoga, the highest aim is the state of being one with the Divine, without the renunciation of life in the world. For such a fulfillment of the consciousness, the urge for perfection must not be confined to a few individuals. There must be "a general spiritual awakening and aspiration in mankind" as well as "a dynamic re-creating of individual manhood in the spiritual type." This would lead eventually to the emergence of a new type of being, the gnostic being, which "would be the hope of a more harmonious evolutionary order in terrestrial Nature".

Publications 

Sri Aurobindo Ashram is the primary publisher of the works of Sri Aurobindo and the Mother. As of January 2015 it keeps some 200 publications in English in print, of which 78 are books by Sri Aurobindo, 44 books by the Mother, 27 compilations from their works, and 47 books by other authors. These books are printed at the Sri Aurobindo Ashram Press, which has been in operation since the 1940s. They are distributed by SABDA, the Ashram's book distribution service, which has been in operation since the 1950s. SABDA also carries books relating to Sri Aurobindo, the Mother, and their yoga brought out by other publishers, making the number of English books on their list more than 600. The Ashram also publishes books in 17 other European and Indian languages, for a total of more than 550 publications. SABDA carries these and other non-English titles: in all there are 1678 titles in 23 languages.

The photographs of Sri Aurobindo and The Mother are printed in-house and is available from Ashram Reception Service. Sizes are available to suit table-top to large wall frames.

Collected works 
The Complete Works of Sri Aurobindo (new edition) are being issued in 37 volumes, of which 36 have been published. The Collected Works of the Mother have been issued in 17 volumes.

Periodicals 
The Ashram publishes a number of journals relating to the philosophy and yoga of Sri Aurobindo and the Mother. These are currently printed at the Sri Aurobindo Ashram Press, though several were earlier brought out in other cities. Some of Sri Aurobindo's works first appeared in these and other journals, among them The Advent, a quarterly, which has recently ceased publication. The most important journals in English are:
 Bulletin of Sri Aurobindo International Centre of Education (English-French, formerly Bulletin of Physical Education), quarterly, Pondicherry, since 1949
 Mother India (English), monthly, Pondicherry, since 1949

The Ashram press also prints several journals published by other organizations. These include:
 All India Magazine (English and other languages), monthly, Pondicherry
 Bartika (Bengali), quarterly, Calcutta, since 1942
 Srinvantu, quarterly, Calcutta, since 1956
 World Union (English), monthly, Pondicherry

Governance 

During the early years of the community, Sri Aurobindo and the Mother imposed very few rules on the sadhaks, because they wished them to learn to direct their lives by looking for the divine guidance within. After 1926, written rules were circulated. The main rules were an absolute prohibition of alcohol, drugs, sex and politics. There were also a number of guidelines for the smooth functioning of the collective life of the community. These rules were collected in Rules and Regulations of Sri Aurobindo Ashram, copies of which are given to all members.

The Sri Aurobindo Ashram Trust was established in 1955 to administer the community and its assets. The trust board consists of five Trustees, the first of whom were chosen by the Mother herself. After her passing in 1973, the trustees have chosen replacements by consensus.

The main ashram departments are overseen by department heads who report to the Trustees.

The Ashram, a public charitable trust, is open to all. No distinctions of nationality, religion, caste, gender, or age are observed. Members come from every part of India and many foreign countries. A large number of devotees from Pondicherry and Tamil Nadu visit the Ashram every day, and support the activities of the Ashram in various ways. Many say that they have benefited from the teachings of Sri Aurobindo and the Mother. However, some feel that there is little mingling of ashramites and local people. According to a senior Ashram official, the practice of silence observed by the ashramites may have been misunderstood as rude behaviour.

Controversy 
In compliance with the Central Government's Sexual Harassment of Women at Workplace (Prevention, Prohibition and Redressal) Act, 2013, the Sri Aurobindo Ashram Trust constituted an Internal Complaints Committee in April 2014.

In 2001, a female member was expelled from the ashram for violating a "mandatory rule". Thereafter she filed charges of sexual harassment against various members. These charges were dismissed by committees and government agencies, all of which found the charges false. The then chairperson of the National Commission for Women added that there "appeared to be malicious planning behind the complaints".

See also 
Auroville (not part of Sri Aurobindo Ashram)
Sri Aurobindo International School (not part of Sri Aurobindo Ashram)
The Mother's International School (not part of Sri Aurobindo Ashram)
Integral Life (Link to Ken Wilber; not part of Sri Aurobindo Ashram)

References

External links 

 

Ashram
Hinduism in Puducherry
Ashrams
New Age organizations
Integral thought
Hindu new religious movements
Hindu organizations
Buildings and structures in Pondicherry (city)
Religious buildings and structures in Puducherry
Religious organizations established in 1926
1926 establishments in India
Establishments in French India
Organisations based in Puducherry
Tourism in Puducherry